Quách Công Lịch (born 27 August 1993) is a sprinter and hurdler from Vietnam who specialises in the 400 m distance. He won four silver and two bronze medals at the Southeast Asian Games in 2015–2017, and served as the flag bearer for Vietnam during the opening ceremony in 2015. His younger sister Quách Thị Lan also won multiple medals in the 400 m and 400 m hurdles at the Southeast Asian Games.

References

Vietnamese male sprinters
Vietnamese male hurdlers
People from Thanh Hóa province
1993 births
Living people
Athletes (track and field) at the 2018 Asian Games
Southeast Asian Games medalists in athletics
Southeast Asian Games silver medalists for Vietnam
Southeast Asian Games bronze medalists for Vietnam
Competitors at the 2015 Southeast Asian Games
Competitors at the 2017 Southeast Asian Games
Asian Games competitors for Vietnam
Southeast Asian Games gold medalists for Vietnam
Competitors at the 2019 Southeast Asian Games